

Events
Zhou you wang becomes King of the Zhou Dynasty of China.

Births

Deaths

References

780s BC